Brnović is a surname. Notable people with the surname include:

Bojan Brnović (born 1979), Montenegrin footballer who plays for Diósgyőri VTK as a striker
Branko Brnović (born 1967), retired Montenegrin professional footballer, who played as a defensive midfielder
Dragoljub Brnović, former Montenegrin football player
Nenad Brnović (born 1980), Montenegrin footballer playing for Mes Sarcheshmeh FC

Serbian surnames